Youngtown is a town in Maricopa County, Arizona, United States. As of the 2020 census, the population of the town was 7,056, up from 6,156 in 2010. It is part of the Phoenix metropolitan area.

History
In 1954, two developers bought  of farmland and built the United States' first planned community dedicated exclusively to retirees. Designed by Ben Schleifer, the community was ironically named Youngtown. In 1996, the town, citing its age restrictions, denied extending the stay of a 16-year-old child to live in the community. In response, Arizona Attorney General Grant Woods investigated and determined that the age ordinance was unenforceable. In response, Youngtown repealed the age restrictions in 1999.

Geography
Youngtown is located on the east bank of the Agua Fria River, just south of US 60. It is bordered on the west by El Mirage, on the south by Glendale, and on the east by the much larger retirement community of Sun City.

Climate

Demographics

At the 2000 census, there were 3,010 people, 1,641 households, and 746 families living in the town. The racial makeup of the town was 88.90% White, 1.36% Black or African American, 0.50% Native American, 0.60% Asian, 0.27% Pacific Islander, 7.24% from other races, and 1.13% from two or more races.  12.72% of the population were Hispanic or Latino of any race.

Of the 1,641 households, 7.7% had children under the age of 18 living with them, 35.5% were married couples living together, 8.0% had a female householder with no husband present, and 54.5% were non-families. 50.3% of households were one person and 36.6% were one person aged 65 or older.  The average household size was 1.74 and the average family size was 2.48.

The age distribution was 9.9% under the age of 18, 3.5% from 18 to 24, 12.8% from 25 to 44, 23.4% from 45 to 64, and 50.4% 65 or older.  The median age was 65 years. For every 100 females, there were 70.1 males.  For every 100 females age 18 and over, there were 66.6 males.

The median household income was $23,164 and the median family income was $29,329. Males had a median income of $30,000 versus $22,500 for females. The per capita income for the town was $16,749.  About 9.6% of families and 13.1% of the population were below the poverty line, including 33.1% of those under age 18 and 8.5% of those age 65 or over.

Education
The Peoria Unified School District serves a portion of Youngtown.

Transportation
Youngtown is a member of Valley Metro, the regional transportation agency. Valley Metro Bus route 106 serves the east border of Youngtown on 111th Avenue.

References

External links

 
 Agua Fria Ranch
 Youngtown on Visit Arizona

Planned communities
Phoenix metropolitan area
Retirement communities
Towns in Maricopa County, Arizona